Antonin Baudry (born May 6, 1975,) also known by the writing pseudonym Abel Lanzac, is a French diplomat specializing in cultural affairs, comic book author, screenwriter, and film director.

Biography 
After finishing his studies at lycée Louis-le-Grand, Antonin Baudry began at the École polytechnique in 1994, graduating as an engineer of bridges, water and forest. He graduated second  in literature from École normale supérieure in Paris in 1998. and obtained a Diplôme d'études approfondies (DEA) en cinematography.

In April 2004, he became a conseiller of Minister Dominique de Villepin at the Ministry of the Interior.

From 2010 to 2014, he was the cultural counsellor at the French Embassy in Washington D.C., United States and counsellor for cooperation and cultural action at the French Embassy in Madrid, Spain.

Under the pseudonym Abel Lanzac, he used his diplomatic experience to help him write the comic book Quai d'Orsay (2010-2011), in collaboration with Christophe Blain. After the second comic book in this series won the prix du meilleur album at the festival d'Angoulême 2013, he revealed his true identity.

In 2014, he founded Albertine, the only French-language bookstore in New York. Named for the mysterious beloved in Marcel Proust's novel In Search of Lost Time, the bookstore shares the Payne Whitney House with the Cultural Services arm of the French embassy.

On January 28, 2015, Baudry was appointed as Ambassador for French Culture at the Institut français. He resigned after a few months to work on personal projects.

He was president of the jury for the 43rd festival international de la bande dessinée in January 2016.

In 2019, he directed his first film, Le Chant du loup, a submarine thriller.

Work

Comic books 
 Quai d'Orsay, with Christophe Blain, Dargaud, 2 vol., 2010-2011.

Filmography 
 2013 : Quai d'Orsay, script with Christophe Blain and Bertrand Tavernier
 2019 : Le Chant du loup, script and director

Games 
 La Course à l’Élysée, drawn by Christophe Blain, Letheia, 2012.

Prizes 
 2010:  
Grand Prix RTL de la bande dessinée for Quai d'Orsay : Chroniques diplomatiques (with Christophe Blain)
Prix Saint-Michel for Quai d'Orsay : Chroniques diplomatiques (with Christophe Blain)
 2013 :
Prix Micheluzzi for Quai d'Orsay t. 2 (with Christophe Blain)

References

External links 
 Antonin Baudry from Savoirs en multimédia at École normale supérieure.
 Antonin Baudry at Université Columbia.

French diplomats
French film directors
1975 births
Living people